Carl Gösta Björn Joachim von der Esch (11 January 1930 – 10 March 2010) was a Swedish Christian democratic politician, member of the Riksdag 1998–2006.

Esch had a farming business and did a Ph.D. in business administration at Uppsala University in 1972. Before joining the Christian Democrats, he had previously represented Moderate Party in the Riksdag 1991–1994, replacing Per Westerberg during his time as a minister. At the time of the Swedish 1994 referendum on membership in the European Union, Esch clashed with the Moderate Party as he campaigned on the "no" side. When he subsequently formed a list of EU critics that ran in the 1995 European Parliament election in Sweden, he was expelled from the party. This list was unsuccessful in the election, and von der Esch returned to parliamentary politics in 1998 as a Christian Democrat.

In the 2003 referendum on joining the Economic and Monetary Union and the euro, he again campaigned on the "no" side. He later joined the June List, became its vice chairman in 2008, and was on second place on the June List ballot in the 2009 European Parliament election in which the party lost its representation in the European Parliament.

References

1930 births
2010 deaths
June List politicians
Members of the Riksdag 1998–2002
Members of the Riksdag 2002–2006
Members of the Riksdag from the Christian Democrats (Sweden)
Members of the Riksdag from the Moderate Party
Uppsala University alumni